The Copa Mercosur 1998 was the 1st staging of the international club cup.

The competition started on 29 July 1998  and concluded on 29 December 1998 with Palmeiras beating Cruzeiro in the final.

Participants

 Boca Juniors
 San Lorenzo
 Independiente
 Vélez Sársfield
 River Plate
 Racing
 Vasco da Gama
 Flamengo
 Corinthians
 Cruzeiro
 São Paulo
 Palmeiras
 Grêmio
 Colo Colo
 Universidad Católica
 Universidad de Chile
 Cerro Porteño
 Olimpia
 Nacional
 Peñarol

Details
 The 20 teams were divided into 5 groups of 4 teams. Each team plays the other teams in the group twice. The top team from each group qualified for the quarter-finals along with the best 3 runners up.
 From the quarter finals to the final, two legs were played in each round. In the result of a draw, the match was decided by a penalty shoot out.

Group stage

Group A

Group B

Group C

Group D

Group E

Ranking of second placed teams

Quarter-finals

First leg

Second leg

Palmeiras won 4–2 on aggregate.

Cruzeiro won 4–1 on aggregate.

Olimpia won 6–4 on aggregate.

1-1 on aggregate. San Lorenzo won 2-0 on penalties.

Semi-finals

First leg

Second leg

Match abandoned after 69 minutes due to crowd trouble. Result allowed to stand. Palmeiras won 3–0 on aggregate.

Cruzeiro won 2-1 on aggregate.

Final

First leg

Second leg

Play Off

References
RSSSF - Copa Mercosur 1998

Copa Mercosur
3
Merc